Bombus distinguendus, the great yellow bumblebee, is a species of bumblebee found in Austria, Belgium, the Czech Republic, Denmark, Finland, France, Germany, Great Britain, Hungary, Ireland, Lithuania, Poland, Romania, Slovakia, Switzerland, northern Russia, and North America.

It is an endangered species in Ireland. In Great Britain, it survives on the far north Highlands coast, Orkney, and the Western Isles.

References

Bumblebees
Hymenoptera of Europe
Insects described in 1869